Terry Nelson may refer to:

 Terry Nelson (American football), American football player
 Terry Nelson (musician), American disc jockey and musician